The following is a list of notable people associated with the University of Missouri–Kansas City, located in the American city of Kansas City, Missouri.

Notable alumni

Politics and government

 Brian Birdwell, Texas State Senator
 Hilary A. Bush, Missouri lieutenant governor
 Sharice Davids, Member of the U.S. House of Representatives for Kansas' 3rd District
 David F. Duncan, drug policy consultant to President Bill Clinton
 Zel Fischer, Missouri Supreme Court Judge
 Jeffrey Friedman, Mayor of Austin, Texas
Allan J. Katz, City Commissioner of Tallahassee and American Ambassador to Portugal
 Clarence M. Kelley, director of the Federal Bureau of Investigation, 1973–78
 Clarence Ollson Senior, Executive Secretary of the Socialist Party of America and academic
 Sam Page, Missouri State Representative for 6 years, and 2008 candidate for Missouri State Lieutenant Governor
 Bill Reardon, Kansas politician
 Rick Scott, US Senator
 Katheryn Shields, Jackson County executive
 Harry S. Truman, President of the United States (attended night classes at the Law School but never graduated from any college)
 William L. Webster, Missouri politician
 Charles Evans Whittaker, Associate Justice, Supreme Court of the United States

Athletics

Roberto Albuquerque, soccer defender, USL Championship (USL)
Coady Andrews, soccer defender, Major Indoor Soccer League and USL
Manny Catano, soccer midfielder, USISL, Eastern Indoor Soccer League, and the National Premier Soccer League (NPSL)
Levi Coleman, soccer forward, USL and NPSL
Kevin Corby, soccer goalkeeper, Major Arena Soccer League and USL
 Tony Dumas, basketball player for the Dallas Mavericks; the only player from UMKC to be drafted in the NBA (1994)
 Donald Fehr, Executive Director, National Hockey League Players Association
Eric McWoods, soccer forward, League of Ireland Premier Division
Jony Muñoz, soccer midfielder, 2020 Gatorade Boys' Soccer Player of the Year
Bryan Pérez, soccer midfielder, United States Soccer Federation and USL
 Mike Racy (J.D., 1992), former NCAA vice president (1993–2013); current commissioner for the Mid-America Intercollegiate Athletics Association (2017-present)
Jordan Rideout, soccer forward, USL
Connor Sparrow, soccer goalkeeper, Major League Soccer and USL
Bob Stein (born 1948), American football linebacker, College Football Hall of Fame, Jewish Sports Hall of Fame, Super Bowl champion, played for the Kansas City Chiefs, Los Angeles Rams, Minnesota Vikings, and San Diego Chargers graduated in the top 10% of the UMKC Law School.

Business
 Thomas D. Barr (1931–2008), prominent lawyer at Cravath, Swaine & Moore
 Henry W. Bloch (1922–2019), businessman and philanthropist, co-founded tax-preparation company H&R Block.
 Jay B. Dillingham, President of the Kansas City Stockyards

Media and arts
 Rita Blitt (born Rita Copaken; 1931), painter, sculptor, and filmmaker
 Robert Brookmeyer, jazz trombonist
 Danny Carey, drummer for the band Tool
 Rajiv Chilaka, creator of cartoon TV programs, most notable for Chhota Bheem
 Vinson Cole, opera tenor
 Nick Gehlfuss, actor
 Mark Katzman, writer and musician
 Mike Keefe, Pulitzer Prize-winning cartoonist
 Suzanne Klotz (born 1944), painter and sculptor
 Edie McClurg, actress
 James Mobberley, composer and musician
 Mikel Rouse, music composer
 Craig Stevens, actor	
 Leith Stevens, film composer
 Shelby Storck, television producer
 Connor Trinneer, actor
Hazel Volkart, composer
 J. Michael Yates, poet and dramatist

Science, technology, and medicine
 John D. Carmack, video game programmer
 Juris Hartmanis, computer scientist, Turing Award by ACM (considered the Nobel Prize of Computing)
 Jonathan Metzl (born 1964), psychiatrist and author, Frederick B. Rentschler II Professor of Sociology and Psychiatry at Vanderbilt University, and the author of multiple books, including The Protest Psychosis and Dying of Whiteness

Notable faculty

 William K. Black, lawyer, author, former bank regulator, and developer of the concept of "control fraud"
 Moissaye Boguslawski (1887–1944), pianist, composer, editor and teacher 
 John Ciardi (1916-1986), poet, translator of Dante
 Louis Colaianni, author, voice and speech coach
 Vinson Cole, voice teacher, international opera singer (tenor)
 Horace B. Davis, Marxian economist, fired in 1954 after refusing to testify before HUAC
 John Ezell, award-winning scenic designer, Hall Family Foundation Professor of Design
 Mark Funkhouser, former Mayor of Kansas City, Missouri
 Michael Hudson, research professor of economics and former Wall Street analyst
 J. Camille Hall vice chancellor for diversity and inclusion
 Jason Kander (born 1981), attorney, author, veteran, former Missouri Secretary of State
 Benny Kim, Associate Professor of violin
 Kris Kobach, Kansas Secretary of State, on leave as Daniel L. Brenner Professor of Law, former White House fellow
 Jan Kregel, post-Keynesian economist, professor of economics
 John D. Lantos (born 1954), pediatrician, expert in medical ethics, Professor of Pediatrics 
 Felicia Hardison Londré, theatre historian and dramaturg, Dean of the College of Fellows of the American Theatre
 Zhou Long, contemporary classical composer, professor of musical composition, Pulitzer Prize-winning composer
 Yudell Luke (1918–1983), mathematician, awarded the N. T. Veatch award for Distinguished Research and Creative Activity, Curator's Professor
 Ernest Manheim, sociologist, namesake of Manheim Hall
 Tom Mardikes, sound designer, music producer, Chair of UMKC Theatre
 Hans Morgenthau (1904-1980), political scientist and founder of classical realism in international relations
Ryan Pore (born 1983), former professional soccer player, and head coach of the Roos men's soccer team since January 2020.
 Richard Rhodes, Pulitzer Prize-winning author
 Noliwe Rooks, one of first Black professors in the College of Arts and Sciences, associate director of African-American program at Princeton University, W.E.B. Du Bois Professor of Literature at Cornell University, chair of/professor in Africana Studies Department at (and founding director of Segrenomics Lab at) Brown University
 Theodore Swetz, actor, stage director, and professor
Whitney Terrell, author, journalist, and professor
 Bobby Watson, jazz saxophonist
 Chen Yi, contemporary classical composer, professor of musical composition
 Rich Zvosec, former basketball coach

References

University of Missouri-Kansas City people